Bel canto is an opera term that literally means "beautiful singing".

Bel Canto may also refer to: 
Bel Canto (novel), a novel by Ann Patchett
Bel canto (opera), a 2015 opera by Jimmy López, based on Patchett's novel
Bel Canto (film), a 2018 hostage drama film based on Patchett's novel
Bel Canto (band), a Norwegian pop/electronica band
Bel Canto (restaurant), a restaurant chain